Down St Mary is a small village and civil parish off the A377 in Mid Devon in the English county of Devon.  It has a population of 316.

References

External links

Villages in Devon